Antioch is an unincorporated community in Clark County, in the U.S. state of Missouri.

History
A post office called Antioch was established in 1883, and remained in operation until 1907. The community took its name from a nearby Methodist church of the same name.

In 1925, Antioch had 45 inhabitants.

References

Unincorporated communities in Clark County, Missouri
Unincorporated communities in Missouri